John Doe is an American science fiction drama television series that aired on Fox during the 2002–2003 TV season.

Synopsis

In the opening scene of the series' pilot episode, a mysterious man awakens on an island off the coast of Seattle, Washington, naked, with absolutely no memory of who he is or how he got there. However, apart from the details of his own past, "John Doe", as he comes to call himself, seems to have access to the sum total of all human knowledge: he knows how many dimples are on a golf ball, the population of Morocco, and other such obscure (and not-so-obscure) facts. He also has expert knowledge on everything from the stock market to computers. Over the course of the series John attempts to find clues about his past by using his unusual ability while also helping to solve crimes with the Seattle police department. In the process it becomes clear that an international conspiracy known as the Phoenix Organization is watching John's every move.

Who is John Doe?
Due to the series' cancellation, the final episode ended with an unresolved cliffhanger, revealing that Digger, John's close friend, was in fact the leader of the Phoenix Organization. In an interview with Entertainment Weekly, series creators Brandon Camp and Mike Thompson revealed what would have happened and John Doe's true identity.

Cast

Main cast
 Dominic Purcell as John Doe (21 episodes)
 John Marshall Jones as Frank Hayes (20 episodes)
 Jayne Brook as Jamie Avery (20 episodes)
 Sprague Grayden as Karen Kawalski (13 episodes)
 William Forsythe as Digger (19 episodes)

Recurring cast
 Rekha Sharma as Stella
 David Lewis as Stu
 Michelle Hart as Nance Fenton
 Grace Zabriskie as Yellow Teeth
 Gary Werntz as Trenchcoat
 David Parker as Detective Roosevelt
 Gabrielle Anwar as Rachel
 Matt Winston as Samuel Donald Clarkson

Episodes

Syndication
On January 20, 2006, the series was syndicated to the Sci-Fi channel.

Reception
On Metacritic, the series has a score of 65 out of 100 based on 22 reviews, indicating "generally favorable reviews". On Rotten Tomatoes, the series has an approval rating of 73% with an average rating of 7/10 based on 26 reviews, with a critical consensus stating: "John Doe overcomes its somewhat dubious premise with an alluring sense of mystery and a nuanced performance from Dominic Purcell." Phil Gallo of Variety wrote, "It's so stylishly executed, with Mimi Leder's direction, a crisp script and magnetic lead by Dominic Purcell, that the John Doe indeed has a solid identity."

See also
 Coronet Blue
 Kyle XY
 Akashic records
 Blindspot (TV series)

References

External links
 
 

2002 American television series debuts
2003 American television series endings
2000s American science fiction television series
Fox Broadcasting Company original programming
Television shows set in Seattle
Television shows filmed in Vancouver
English-language television shows
Fiction about amnesia
Television series by 20th Century Fox Television